The Myricaceae are a small family of dicotyledonous shrubs and small trees in the order Fagales. There are three genera in the family, although some botanists separate many species from Myrica into a fourth genus Morella. About 55 species are usually accepted in Myrica (with Morella included), one in Canacomyrica, and one in Comptonia.

Well-known members of this family include bayberry and sweetfern.

 Canacomyrica Guillaumin 1940
 Comptonia L'Hér. ex Aiton 1789
 Myrica L. 1753 (includes: Morella Lour. 1790)

Systematics
Modern molecular phylogenetics suggest the following relationships:

References 

 
Rosid families